Caladenia splendens, commonly known as the splendid spider orchid, or splendid white spider orchid is a species of orchid endemic to the south-west of Western Australia. It has a single erect, hairy leaf and up to three mostly white flowers with a fringe of long teeth on the sides of the labellum. Along with the giant spider orchid, Caladenia excelsa it is the largest of the spider orchids.

Description 
The sepals and petals have long, brownish thread-like tips and often have red lines on their backs. Flowering occurs from September to October.

Taxonomy and naming 
Caladenia splendens was first formally described in 2001 by Stephen Hopper and Andrew Phillip Brown from a specimen collected near Gingin and the description was published in Nuytsia. The specific epithet (splendens) is a Latin word meaning "splendid" or "resplendent" referring to the "brilliant white" colour of this orchid.

Distribution and habitat 
The splendid spider orchid is found between Gingin and Frankland in the Avon Wheatbelt, Geraldton Sandplains, Jarrah Forest and Swan Coastal Plain biogeographic regions where it grows in woodland and forest in moist gullies and other places where water is available in winter.

Conservation
Caladenia splendens is classified as "not threatened" by the Government of Western Australia Department of Parks and Wildlife.

References 

splendens
Endemic orchids of Australia
Orchids of Western Australia
Plants described in 2001
Endemic flora of Western Australia
Taxa named by Stephen Hopper
Taxa named by Andrew Phillip Brown